We Are Messengers are a Christian band originally from Monaghan, Ireland, but have been based in the US since 2015. Their first studio album, We Are Messengers, was released in 2016 through Word Records and Curb Records. The album hit the top 10 on Billboard album charts and top 15 on the Billboard Heatseeker charts. The follow-up EP, Honest, was released in 2019 and reached the top 10 of the Billboard Christian Albums chart.

Background

The band formed in Monaghan, Ireland, in 2015. Current members include Darren Mulligan (lead vocalist), Kyle Williams (vocalist and guitarist), Drew Kerxton (drummer), and Raul Aguilar (bassist).

The group's first studio album, We Are Messengers, was released on 22 April 2016 through Word Records and Curb Records. This album peaked at No. 10 on the Billboard Top Christian Albums chart and hit No. 16 on the Top Heatseekers Albums. Their second EP, Honest, released on 29 March 2019, charting at No. 7 on the Top Christian Albums chart and No. 44 on the Top Album Sales chart.

The band has had five Billboard Christian Airplay top tens, including "Maybe It's Ok" and "Magnify."

Members 

Current
 Darren Mulligan – lead vocals, guitar
 Kyle Williams – guitar
 Raul Aguilar – bass
 Drew Kerxton – drums

Discography

Studio albums

EPs

Singles

Promotional singles

Compilations

 2016: WOW Hits 2017, "Everything Comes Alive" (from We Are Messengers)
 2017: WOW Hits 2018, "Magnify" (from We Are Messengers)
 2017: The Shack Soundtrack, "I'll Think About You"
 2018: WOW Hits 2019, "Point To You" (from We Are Messengers)

Awards and nominations

GMA Dove Awards

Notes

References

External links
 

Musical groups established in 2015
Irish rock music groups
Word Records artists
Curb Records artists
Musical groups from County Monaghan
2015 establishments in Ireland